Elysia may signify the following:

Elysia (band), a deathcore band
Elysia (gastropod), a genus of gastropods
Elysium, a section of the underworld containing the Elysian Fields
Elysia, a terrestrial planet in Metroid Prime 3: Corruption
Elysia (name)